Eggs 'n' Baker is a Saturday morning Children's BBC music and cookery show presented by Bucks Fizz singer Cheryl Baker. It was often shown in the early morning slot before the magazine show, Going Live!.

During this time Baker was still a member of Bucks Fizz and would often appear with the group on the show.

The show ran on BBC1 from 1988 to 1993.

References

1988 British television series debuts
1993 British television series endings
1980s British children's television series
1990s British children's television series
1980s British cooking television series
1990s British cooking television series
BBC children's television shows
British cooking television shows
English-language television shows